Alexandromenia is a genus of solenogaster, a kind of shell-less, worm-like mollusk.

Species
 Alexandromenia acuminata Salvini-Plawen, 1978
 Alexandromenia agassizi Heath, 1911
 Alexandromenia antartica Salvini-Plawen, 1978
 Alexandromenia avempacensis Pedrouzo & Cobo, 2014
 Alexandromenia crassa Odhner, 1920
 Alexandromenia grimaldii Leloup, 1946
 Alexandromenia gulaglandulata Salvini-Plawen, 2008
 Alexandromenia heteroglandulata Salvini-Plawen & Schwabe, 2012
 Alexandromenia latosoleata Salvini-Plawen, 1978
 Alexandromenia marisjaponica Saito & Salvini-Plawen, 2014
 Alexandromenia pilosa Handl & Salvini-Plawen, 2002
 Alexandromenia valida Heath, 1911

References

 Heath H. (1911). Reports on the scientific results of the expedition to the Tropical Pacific, in charge of Alexander Agassiz, by the U. S. Fish Commission Steamer Albatross, from August 1899 to June 1900, Commander Jefferson F. Moser. XVI. The Solenogastress. Memoirs of the Museum of Comparative Zoölogy at Harvard College 45: 1-182 pl. 1-40 
 Salvini-Plawen L v. (1978). Antarktische und subantarktische Solenogastres (eine Monographie: 1898-1974). Zoologica (Stuttgart) 128: 1-305.
 García-Álvarez O., Salvini-Plawen L.v., Urgorri V. & Troncoso J.S. (2014). Mollusca. Solenogastres, Caudofoveata, Monoplacophora. Fauna Iberica. 38: 1-294.

Solenogastres